Albany High School (AHS) is a comprehensive public high school located in Albany, California in the San Francisco Bay Area. The school educates approximately 1,300 students from grades 9 through 12.

Achievements

In 2001, Albany was accredited by the Western Association of Schools and Colleges for the maximum term of six years. Albany High School was #756 nationally ranked in 2016, and #119 among California high schools.

The school is known for its athletic, science, math, and music programs.

Music programs

The music program at the school serves approximately 250 students and supports choral, orchestral, concert band, and jazz programs. Craig Bryant is the Director of Instrumental Music, a position he has held since the fall of 2007. Students participate in the Jazz School Studio bands, the Oakland, Berkeley and San Francisco Youth Orchestras, and the CMEA and CBDA All-State Bands, as well as with other area honor groups.

The instrumental music program is made up of two concert bands, two jazz bands, and a string orchestra. There are approximately 140 students involved in the program, with about half the jazz students also participating in one of the concert bands. Each group at the school meets three times per week to rehearse (for 50 minutes on Mondays, and 90 on Tuesdays/Thursdays or Wednesdays/Fridays). 
 
The ensembles at AHS perform four main concerts a year in addition to participating in festivals and recording competitions. The groups have garnered positive attention through performances at Yoshi's Oakland, Ashkenaz, the Freight and Salvage, and other Bay Area venues.

The Albany High School Jazz Band has received top ratings and awards at the Folsom, Reno, and Santa Cruz Jazz Festivals. The 2010 group performed as a featured ensemble at the 2010 California Music Education Association State Conference in Sacramento. The band was also selected as a finalist for the 2010 Next Generation Festival, presented by the Monterey Jazz Festival, and the 2010 Essentially Ellington festival, presented by Jazz at Lincoln Center in New York, New York.

STEM programs
Albany High School has many competing STEM teams, most notably Science Bowl, National Ocean Science Bowl, and Science Olympiad.

Since it was founded at Albany Middle School (Division B) in 2013, Albany's Science Olympiad has qualified for state 4 times. In 2017 and 2018, the Albany High School Science Olympiad (Division C) team won first place in the Bay Area Regional Science Olympiad, and placed 5th and 3rd overall respectively at State.

The Science Bowl team won the 1993 Department of Energy National Science Bowl competition. Albany High won its 2008 Science Bowl regional competition, defeating academic rival Mission San Jose High School. In 2009, Albany won its regional National Science Bowl competition, placing fifth nationwide.

In 2012, the school National Ocean Sciences Bowl team went to Baltimore for Nationals, where they took seventh place. In 2013, the National Ocean Sciences Bowl team went to Milwaukee for Nationals and took fifth place. In 2016, Albany went to North Carolina for Nationals, where it won first place in the 2016 Department of Commerce National Ocean Sciences Bowl competition. In 2018, Albany won the regional NOSB competition, and placed fourth overall in the national finals in Colorado later that year. In 2019, Albany took home a second national championship in Washington, D.C., going undefeated in both the buzzer portion and the Scientific Expert Briefing portion of the competition.

Athletics

Athletic teams 
Athletic teams of Albany High School belong to the Tri Counties Athletic League (TCAL) in the North Coast Section (NCS) of the California Interscholastic Federation (CIF), which manages all high school sports teams in California. Fall sports include football, girls' and boys' cross country, girls' volleyball, girls' golf, and girls' tennis. Sports offered during the winter are girls' and boys' soccer, girls' and boys' basketball, and girls' and boys' wrestling. Sports teams offered during the spring include softball, baseball, girls' and boys' track and field, girls' and boys' swimming, boys' golf, and boys' tennis.

Athletic achievements 
Albany High's soccer team was successful in 2010, with the varsity boys' and girls' teams going undefeated in the winter season of 2010. The girls' volleyball team went to the Northern California State Championships in 2011, but lost. In February 2014, the girls' wrestling team took first place at the CIF State tournament. In November 2021 senior Sophia Nordenholz ran the fastest girls time in the State Cross-Country Championships while winning the individual Division IV State Championship, posting the 7th fastest time in state meet history. At the same meet the boys' cross-country team won the Division IV State Championship, with junior Sean Morello taking 3rd place and sophomore Lucas Cohen taking 13th.

Campus history

In 1997, Albany High School's main building and gymnasium, both completed in 1934, were deemed to be seismically unsound. They were demolished, and construction began on a new campus. During the four years of construction, between 1997 and 2001, classes were held in portable trailers. The new school building and gymnasium opened in 2001.

During the 2004–2005 school year, several security cameras were installed in the building to prevent vandalism.

In 2004, the school suffered overcrowding due to an overly large freshman class. The large influx of students was caused in part by an Albany Unified School District policy, which allowed students from other cities such as El Cerrito and Richmond to enter Albany schools.

The school mascot is the cougar and the school colors are red and white.

The current principal as of the 2017–2018 school year is Alexa Ritchie, who was formerly the principal of Marin Elementary School in the same school district.

Academic competitions
Albany participates in many local competitions, including NAQT, NOSB's Otter Bowl (which they won in 2006 and took fourth in nationwide), and the National Science Bowl, in which they also took fourth place nationwide.

The school hosts a well-established Model United Nations program. In the 2010–2011 academic year, Albany became home to a forensic (Speech and Debate) team. The Albany High Speech and Debate team is a member of the Golden Gate Speech Association and the National Forensic League. Both programs are established in club format; while other local schools have classes dedicated solely to Model UN and debate, Albany runs both programs as student clubs.

Instagram postings controversy
On May 1, 2017, four Albany High students filed suit against the school arguing that they had been punished unfairly for their involvement with racist harassment on Instagram. The students and their lawyers claimed that the school had violated their First Amendment rights by punishing them for actions that took place outside of school grounds and outside of school hours. The complaints also stated that the students were refused protection by Jeff Anderson as a growing body of students gathered outside of the office where they were meeting for a restorative justice session. As the four students attempted to leave through their peers, two of the students were struck in the head by an enraged demonstrator, while others hid in a locked vehicle for safety, prompting complaints that the school mishandled the situation and allowed an unruly assembly to take place. Many teachers did not take attendance or mark students as absent for attending the unsanctioned assembly. In the interim between the original incident and the lawsuit, principal Jeff Anderson was reassigned within the district, and former principal Ron Rosenbaum took over as interim principal for the remainder of the school year.

On May 26, Judge James Donato granted an order to halt the expulsion hearing for plaintiff Kevin Chen, which was scheduled for June 1 of that year. The ruling stated, "The Court is also advised that Chen is a rising senior about to start the college admissions process, and being wrongly expelled would likely cause irreparable harm to his admission prospects."

Neighborhoods zoned to Albany
The entire city of Albany is zoned to this school. The University Village development, a student housing complex of the University of California Berkeley which houses families, is assigned to this school.

Notable alumni

 Tim Armstrong, 1984 - punk rock, musician, singer and guitarist for Operation Ivy and Rancid
 Rick "Grizzly" Brown, 1978 - former professional strongman; competed in World's Strongest Man competitions in 1985 (6th) and 1986 (8th)
 Jordan Capozzi, 2008 - rapper who is known by her stage name Lil Debbie
 John Crewdson, 1963 - Pulitzer Prize-winning journalist and author
 Matt Freeman, 1984 - bass guitar player for Operation Ivy and Rancid
DeVon Franklin, 1996 - Preacher, Television Personality
 Edi Gathegi, 1997 - actor; House MD, Twilight
 Tyson Griffin, 2002 -  professional MMA fighter, formerly with the UFC
 Ron Hansen, 1956 - Major League Baseball player; 1960 American League Rookie of the Year; one of the few players in history to turn an unassisted triple play, July 30, 1968
 Louis A. Mackey - NFL football player
 Lil B The BasedGod, 2005 - member of The Pack rap group, real name  Brandon McCartney
 Young L, 2005 - member of The Pack rap group, real name  Lloyd Omadhebo
 Ron Silliman, 1964 - poet and author
 Kellita Smith, 1986 - actress, The Bernie Mac Show
Jim Thiebaud, 1983 - skateboarder, co-founder of Real Skateboards
Warren Thomas, 1977 - comedian; winner of the 1987 San Francisco International Comedy Competition; writer for TV show In Living Color
 Amani Toomer - NFL football player (attended AHS for one year before transferring to De La Salle in Concord)

See also

 Albany Unified School District

References

External links 
 Albany High School official website

Educational institutions in the United States with year of establishment missing
Educational institutions established in the 1930s
Albany Unified School District
High schools in Alameda County, California
Public high schools in California
1930s establishments in California